Gull Glacier is a glacier in the Osborn Range of north-central Ellesmere Island, Nunavut, Canada. It lies in the Tanquary Fiord in Quttinirpaaq National Park.

References

Traveling luck for Gull Glacier 

Glaciers of Qikiqtaaluk Region
Ellesmere Island
Arctic Cordillera